Janelle Smiley (born 1981) is an American ski mountaineer and mountain climber.

Smiley was born in Aspen, Colorado, and lives in Jackson Hole, Wyoming.

Selected results 
 2011:
 7th, World Championship, vertical race
 7th, World Championship, relay, together with Nina Cook Silitch and Jari Kirkland
 8th, World Championship, team, together with Nina Cook Silitch
 9th, World Championship, individual
 2012:
 1st, North American Championship, individual
 1st, North American Championship, total ranking
 2nd, North American Championship, sprint

References

External links 
 Janelle Smiley at SkiMountaineers.org
 Janelle Smiley at Athleta.net
 Personal website

1981 births
Living people
American female ski mountaineers
Sportspeople from Aspen, Colorado
21st-century American women